The Canton Merchants' Corps Uprising or Incident was a contest between the Canton Merchants' Volunteer Corps and the Nationalist army in Guangzhou, China, in late 1924. It ended in a decisive government victory.

History

Background

In 1911, during the period of Xinhai Revolution, society was in chaos. Merchants in Guangzhou (then known as "Canton") established a volunteers corps for self-defense and security. Chen Lianbo, also known as Chan Lim Pak, was elected commander, and also Director of Finance at the Canton Merchants' Public Safety Organization. Chen supported the volunteer corps and lent funds for the corps to buy weapons. In 1917, Chen, as leader of the CMPSO, continued to provide weapons for the corps. In August 1919, he served as its regimental commander. The size of the corps reached 13,000 in 1924. The Corps maintained a neutral attitude during this period of frequent regime changes in Guangzhou. For their protection of merchants' interests and public security, the Corps were welcomed by many citizens in Guangzhou.

In 1923, allying with the Yunnan and Guangxi cliques, Sun Yat-sen's army defeated Chen Jiongming and occupied Guangzhou. However, Sun broke the promises of his Constitutional Protection Movement to govern along the lines of the old Chinese constitution. Instead, a conscription law was passed and property from temples was confiscated for sale by the state, both angering many citizens. The government also began issuing large sums of money, driving up inflation. Due to its huge military expenses, the Nationalist government had to revoke Chen Jiongming's prohibition on gambling. These governmental decisions dissatisfied the local populace to a large extent.

In January 1924, after its first national conference, the Nationalists adopted new policies including "Unite with Russia" and "Accept Communism". Worrying that Sun would eventually adopt Communism in Guangzhou, the Canton merchants changed their attitudes towards the government. In May, the Nationalists announced a law of "unified road ownership" to impose a new tax and caused further dissatisfaction.  In August, many strikes happened in Guangzhou. The Canton Merchants' Corps established its "Defense Headquarters", in which Chen was the commander and Deng Jieshi and Chen Gongshou vice-commanders. After further negotiations, the government decided to withdraw the road ownership law and the strike was suspended.

Uprising

On August 10, 1924, the British-registered ship Harvard arrived in Guangzhou, carrying some 9000 guns, 40 machine gun, and 3 million rounds of ammunition purchased by the merchants' corps from a British company. The merchants' corps had already been approved for the weapon purchase, but the ship was immediately detained by Chiang Kai-shek's Jianggu. The government claimed that both the quantity of weapons and their arrival date did not match what had been stated. On August 12 and 15, about a thousand of the Canton Merchants' Corps marched to Sun's office and appealed to the government to release their weapons. Sun refused and the merchants' corps called a strike all over the Guangdong Province.

On August 24, Sun Yat-sen announced a curfew in Guangzhou, and a warrant was issued for Chen Lianbo's arrest. Two days later, Nanhai, Panyu, Shunde, Taishan, Dongwan, Zengcheng, Xinhui, Qingyuan, Gaoyao, Qujiang, Yangjiang, Luoding, and 20 other counties decided to join the strike in support of the merchants' corps. Inside the Nationalist government, Wang Jingwei and Hu Hanmin disagreed with Sun's proposal of suppression; Liao Zhongkai, who approved it, was forced to resign. On September 4, Sun left Guangzhou for Shaoguan, the base of Northern Expedition, and appointed Hu as the governor . On September 15, Chen Lianbo and Chen Gongshou posted that the merchants' corps had no intention to overturn the government in Guangzhou and would abide by orders from Sun and his government. Hu withdrew their arrest warrants, and he released a portion of the seized weapons to the corps.

On the afternoon of October 10, the Communists appointed labor unions, peasant unions, and younger unions with a total of over 50,000 people, joined for a "Double 10 Warning Day". Zhou Enlai conducted the meeting and sent a public warning to the merchants' corps. After the meeting, the CCP held a demonstration and chanted "Beat the Merchants' Corps, Kill Chen Lianbo, and Support the Revolutionary Government". When the crowd came to South Taiping Road (present-day South Renmin Road), they clashed with the merchants' corps, resulting in the death of more than 20 and another 100 injured. The merchants' corps established defense positions in Xiguan, blockaded thoroughfares, and posted notices that "Sun Yat-sen should retire" and "Beat Sun's government". During that night, Chen Lianzhong, Chen Lianbo's brother, met Deng Jieshi, Li Songshao, and other leaders of the merchants' corps.

On the other side, Sun Yat-sen organized a revolutionary committee on 11 October with Xu Zongzhi, Liao Zhongkai, Wang Jingwei, Chiang Kai-shek, Chen Youren, and Tan Pingshan in attendance. On October 15, Chiang led his army of Whampoa Military Academy cadets back to Guangzhou. Together with Sun's other supporters, they swiftly defeated the Merchants' Corp. Chiang was assisted by Soviet advisors, who also supplied him with weapons, while the merchants used weapons purchased from Western countries. Chen had to leave for Hong Kong. During this battle, the business areas in Xiguan were seriously damaged by a great fire.

Aftermath
Financial losses during this conflict was close to HK$50 million. About two thousand people were killed. Afterwards, the Nationalist government collected protection fees from the merchants, seized their weapons, and levied a $200 fine on each of the participators. The government warned those who failed to comply that the "government cannot be held responsible if soldiers loot or capture anybody". After this incident, some businessmen in Canton tended to support Chen Jiongming instead of Sun. However, with the support of Soviet Union, Sun eventually defeated Chen.

When Sun died in Beijing, the government in Beijing decided to hold a state funeral for him. The Guangzhou Chamber of Commerce and Autonomous Council held a joined protest against the decision.

See also
 Timeline of Guangzhou

References

1924 in China
History of Guangzhou
Kuomintang
Cantonese merchants
Rebellions in China
Events in Guangzhou